Professor Ctirad Uher is the C. Wilbur Peters Collegiate Professor at the University of Michigan in Ann Arbor. Born in Prague, Czech Republic, he graduated from the University of New South Wales, Australia in 1972 and earned his Ph.D. from there in 1979.

Career 
He currently teaches in the physics department at the University of Michigan and does research in the field of condensed matter physics.  Ctirad Uher was Associate Dean for two years before becoming Chair of the Physics Department in 1994. In 2004, he stepped down from that position. During Uher's administration the Physics Department faculty expanded enormously, from 60 faculty members to 80. Of these 20 new faculty, 19 eventually received tenure. It was also during this time that Martinus Veltman received his Nobel Prize. Before Uher's administration, there were no distinguished professorships in the physics department; afterward, there were six.

FOCUS 
It was during Uher's administration that FOCUS (Frontiers in Optical Coherent and Ultrafast Science) was started, a program that continued until 2010. It was funded at first by an NSF grant and later through the MURI (Multidisciplinary University Research Initiative).  Thanks in part to FOCUS, the University of Michigan was top-ranked in atomic/molecular/optical physics in the early 2000s.

MCTP 
It was also during Uher's term that the Michigan Center for Theoretical Physics (MCTP) was established, designed to create an intellectual atmosphere conductive to theoretical physicists, a platform for theoretical research. One of the first faculty members hired for the program was Michael Duff, a leading string theorist. The MCTP held several week-long sessions dedicated to specialized topics, for which experts were brought in from other Universities. Gordon Kane was the director of the MCTP for several years.

Center for the Study of Complex Systems 
In 1998 the Program in Nonlinear Studies began, which in 1999 became the Center for the Study of Complex Systems, an interdisciplinary program studying complex systems that reaches out to many other fields including mathematics, biology, and economics.

Recognition 
Uher is a Fellow of the American Physical Society. In 2008, he was chosen for the American Physical Society's Outstanding Referees Program for excellence in peer review.

In 2011, Uher was awarded the Friendship Award by the People's Republic of China.

Publications

Books
Thermal conductivity 25 : thermal expansion 13 : joint conferences, June 13–16, 1999, Ann Arbor, Michigan, USA / Ctirad Uher, editor of proceedings ; Donald Morelli, co-editor of proceedings ; conference host, University of Michigan, Ann Arbor, Michigan, USA. Lancaster, Pa. : Technomic Pub. Co., [c2000] xiv, 391 p. : ill. ; 24 cm.

References

21st-century American physicists
Czechoslovak emigrants to the United States
Czechoslovak expatriates in Australia
Science teachers
Year of birth missing (living people)
Living people
University of New South Wales alumni
University of Michigan faculty
Fellows of the American Physical Society